Marval is a French publishing house specializing in photography.

References

External links 
 Éditions Marval on Bibliomonde
 Marval Official website

Book publishing companies of France
Publishing companies established in 1969
French companies established in 1969